Prateep Areerob (born 16 March 1924) was a Thai sailor. He competed in the Dragon event at the 1964 Summer Olympics.

References

External links
 

1924 births
Possibly living people
Prateep Areerob
Prateep Areerob
Sailors at the 1964 Summer Olympics – Dragon
Place of birth missing (living people)